Veronika Šarec (born May 8, 1969 in Ljubljana, SR Slovenia, SFR Yugoslavia) is a former alpine skier.

In her career, Šarec won one Alpine Skiing World Cup Slalom race, with seven podiums altogether. Her only win was the Haus im Ennstal Slalom in the 1989/90 season. Šarec represented Yugoslavia at the 1984 Winter Olympics and 1988 Winter Olympics and Slovenia at the 1992 Winter Olympics.

World cup results

Season standings

Race podiums
 6 wins – (5 SL, 1 GS)
 13 podiums – (9 SL, 3 GS, 1 SG)

References 

1969 births
Living people
Slovenian female alpine skiers
Olympic alpine skiers of Yugoslavia
Olympic alpine skiers of Slovenia
Alpine skiers at the 1984 Winter Olympics
Alpine skiers at the 1988 Winter Olympics
Alpine skiers at the 1992 Winter Olympics
Skiers from Ljubljana